Barbara J. Meyer (born 1949) is a biologist and genetist, noted for her pioneering research on lambda phage, a virus that infects bacteria; discovery of the master control gene involved in sex determination; and studies of gene regulation, particularly dosage compensation. Meyer's work has revealed mechanisms of sex determination and dosage compensation—that balance X-chromosome gene expression between the sexes in Caenorhabditis elegans that continue to serve as the foundation of diverse areas of study on chromosome structure and function today.

Dr. Meyer is an HHMI investigator, a genetics, genomics and development professor at UC Berkeley, and an adjunct professor in the biochemistry and biophysics department at University of California, San Francisco (UCSF)'s School of Medicine. Her current research focuses on the molecular networks controlling dynamic chromosome behaviors during cell development which endure genome stability.

Biography
Meyer is a native Californian, born and raised in Stockton. Meyer completed her undergraduate BS at Stanford University, working with David Clayton. She began her PhD at the University of California, Berkeley and completed her graduate studies in 1979 at Harvard University in the lab of Mark Ptashne, working on gene regulation in lambda phage, a bacterial virus which infects bacteria E. coli. In 1979 Meyer began postdoctoral research at the MRC Laboratory of Molecular Biology, studying how chromosomes determine sex at the laboratory of Sydney Brenner, who later won a Nobel Prize for establishing the nematode worm Caenorhabditis elegans as an important model organism for research on development. Switching from virus to Caenorhabditis elegans (C. elegans), a roundworm, Meyer still studies gene regulation, but turning to sex determination. Meyer discovered the master gene involved in sex determination.

Meyer's early work focused on how C. elegans "counts" the number of X chromosomes and sets of autosomes to determine its sex, as well as how it adjusts to the imbalance in the number of X chromosomes between the two sexes. In C. elegans, individuals with two X chromosomes are self-fertilizing hermaphrodites; those with only one X chromosome are males. A popular hypothesis when Meyer began her postdoctoral work was that the worms compensate for the difference in the number of copies of genes on the X chromosome between the two sexes. But it wasn't clear whether the worms accomplished this by upregulating genes on the X chromosome in males or by downregulating genes on the X chromosome in hermaphrodites. Meyer established her first lab at MIT after leaving the MRC, starting with the question of how the nematode specifies its sex. Further analysis of the mechanism underlying dosage compensation produced many key insights into gene regulation.

In 1990, Meyer and her husband Tom Cline gave up their tenured positions (she at MIT, he at Princeton) -she accepted a full faculty appointment at the University of California, Berkeley. In 1997, Meyer becomes an HHMI investigator.  Her lab identified a gene they named xol-1 as the master switch for sex determination. Meyer's group also found that transcription factors encoded by both the X chromosome and the autosomes battle to control whether xol-1 is transcriptionally active or inactive.

She became a member of ASCB (American association of cell biology) in 1995. She was also elected as a member to AAAS (American academy of Arts and Sciences) in 1995. In 2014, Meyer was elected to the American Philosophical Society.

In 2018, Meyer was honored with the E.B. Wilson Medal by American Society for Cell Biology's (ASCB) highest honor for science, for her significant and far-reaching contributions to cell biology over a lifetime in science. Meyer was also honored with 2018 Thomas Hunt Morgan Medal which is awarded for lifetime achievement in genetics. This honor is given in recognition of her groundbreaking work on chromosome behaviors that govern gene expression, development, and heredity. At the same year, Meyer was elected to the National Academy of Medicine, considered one of the highest honors in health and medicine, "for groundbreaking work on chromosome dynamics that impact gene expression, development and heredity using the nematode as a model organism.

Notable papers

Awards
 1995 Elected Member, American Academy of Arts and Sciences
 2000 – Member, National Academy of Sciences
 2010 – Genetics Society of America Medal
 Elected Member, American Academy of Microbiology
 2013 selected Miller Senior Fellow of the Miller Institute at the University of California Berkeley
 2017  in Medicine and Physiology from the American Academy of Arts and Sciences 
 2018 Thomas Hunt Morgan Medal awarded for lifetime achievement in genetics "in recognition of her groundbreaking work on chromosome behaviors that govern gene expression, development, and heredity."
 2018 E.B. Wilson Medal from the American Society for Cell Biology, (ASCB) highest honor for science  
 2018 Elected to the National Academy of Medicine

References
 Barbara Meyer faculty profile, UC Berkeley
 "Barbara J. Meyer, Ph.D.", HHMI: Biointeractive, Howard Hughes Medical Institute
 Wormbase profile
 "Who's Who in Sex-Determination Research", Howard Hughes Medical Institute
 "Sex and Repression", Barbara Meyer profile at HHMI

Footnotes

External links
 Meyer Lab website

American geneticists
American women biologists
Stanford University alumni
University of California, Berkeley alumni
Harvard University alumni
Howard Hughes Medical Investigators
University of California, Berkeley faculty
Living people
Members of the United States National Academy of Sciences
1949 births
21st-century American women
Members of the National Academy of Medicine